Prothamnodes bathocentrella is a moth in the family Xyloryctidae. It is found in eastern Madagascar (Maraonasetra).

The wingspan is 31 mm, the length of the forewings 14.5mm that are beige-ochreous with some rusty-brown irrorations.

References

Xyloryctidae
Moths described in 1968